The Porcupine River is a left tributary of the Stikine River in northwestern British Columbia, Canada, entering that stream south of the confluence of the Anuk River and above the confluence of the Iskut.

See also
Stikine Gold Rush
List of British Columbia rivers

References

Rivers of the Boundary Ranges
Stikine Country
Tributaries of the Stikine River
Cassiar Land District